Mohammadabad-e Garavand (also Romanized as Moḩammadābād-e Garāvand; also known as Garāvand) is a village in Rumeshkhan Rural District, Central District, Rumeshkhan County, Lorestan Province, Iran. At the 2006 census, its population was 212, in 52 families.

References 

Populated places in Rumeshkhan County